The Best of Kansas is the first compilation by American progressive rock band Kansas. Originally released in 1984, it featured the new "Perfect Lover," written by then-lead vocalist John Elefante and his brother Dino Elefante. 

The compilation was rereleased in 1999 in a version supervised by the original band members. "Perfect Lover" was dropped in favor of three additional tracks from the original lineup: "The Pinnacle" from Masque, "The Devil Game" from Song for America, and a live track deleted owing to space limitations from the CD version of Two for the Show called "Closet Chronicles," originally from Point of Know Return. 

The album has sold over 4 million copies in the United States and was certified quadruple platinum in 2001.

The versions of "Carry On Wayward Son" and "The Wall" on the 1984 release of The Best of Kansas are remixed by Kerry Livgren and unique to the first version of this collection. For the 1999 reissue of the collection, the original 1976 mixes from the album Leftoverture are used instead. The removal of "Perfect Lover" – previously available only on this album – made the track out of print in the United States. The original track listing and mixes were restored for the 2014 180-gram vinyl release of the album by Friday Music. That version was released on red vinyl a few years later.

Cover art

The album cover art, by artist Steve Carver, is a parody of Grant Wood's 1939 painting of the author Parson Weems pointing to the famous scene of George Washington and George's father inquiring after young George had just chopped down a cherry tree with his hatchet. The cover contains elements of nearly all previous Kansas album covers:
 Kansas: Abolitionist John Brown, as portrayed in the John Steuart Curry mural Tragic Prelude. No tracks from the album appear on either version of The Best of Kansas.
 Song for America: The bird depicted on the front cover of Song for America can be found on the back side, perched atop the track listing.
 Masque: The outline of a fish appears in John Brown's beard. The "face" on the cover of Masque (Giuseppe Arcimboldo's Water) is composed of various marine life. No tracks from Masque appear on the 1984 release.
 Leftoverture: The inkwell and scattered pages of sheet music appear on the back cover.
 Point of Know Return: The ship tipping over the edge of the world is on the front.
 Two for the Show: The spotlights, stage, curtains, and figures in the audience are all indirect references; none of these things (besides an auditorium full of seats) are seen on Two for the Show. On the back cover, there is a mop behind the interrogation chair, which may reference to the cleaning ladies on the cover. No tracks from Two for the Show appear on the 1984 release.
 Monolith: On the back cover, the moon behind a shadow of the figure depicted on Monolith is seen through the open door. No tracks from Monolith appear on either version of The Best of Kansas.
 Audio-Visions: On the back cover, at the right side, one of the two hands on the front cover of Audio-Visions is holding the curtain.
 Vinyl Confessions: The interrogation chair is seen under a spotlight on the back cover.
 Drastic Measures: The black tux and red bow-tie worn by the bazooka 'player' are worn by John Brown here.
Surprisingly, the sailboat on the front cover is later used for Sail On: The 30th Anniversary Collection.

Track listing

1984 original version

1999 reissue

Personnel
 Phil Ehart - drums (all tracks)
 John Elefante - keyboards, vocals (on "Fight Fire with Fire," "Perfect Lover" and "Play the Game Tonight")
 Dave Hope - bass (except on "Perfect Lover")
 Kerry Livgren - guitars, keyboards (except on "Perfect Lover")
 Robby Steinhardt - violin, vocals (except on "Fight Fire with Fire" and "Perfect Lover")
 Steve Walsh - keyboards, vocals (except on "Fight Fire with Fire," "Perfect Lover" and "Play the Game Tonight")
 Rich Williams - guitar (all tracks)

Additional personnel
 Dino Elefante - bass (on "Perfect Lover") 
 Bryan Duncan - backing vocals (on "Perfect Lover")

Production
"The Wall" and "Carry On Wayward Son" remixed by Livgren, Willams and Davey Moiré at Camp Dunwoody Studios, Dunwoody, Georgia, 1984
"Perfect Lover" produced by Kansas, engineered by Kevin Elson, mixed by Neil Kernon at The Record Plant, Los Angeles, California, 1984

Charts 
 

Album

Singles

Certifications

References 

1984 greatest hits albums
Kansas (band) compilation albums
Epic Records compilation albums
Legacy Recordings compilation albums